Partido Alto is a 1982 Brazilian short documentary film directed by Leon Hirszman. Produced by now-defunct Brazilian state film production company Embrafilme, the film details the history of Partido alto, a musical subgenre of Samba focused on the drumming style of Bahia.

The documentary presents partido alto as a blend of freestyle rapping, rhyming and improvisational chorus.

References

External links
Portal Curtas for Petrobrás

Brazilian short documentary films
Brazilian independent films
Documentaries about music
Samba
1982 documentary films
1982 films
1982 independent films
1980s short documentary films